Cabuyao, officially the City of Cabuyao, is a 1st class component city in the province of Laguna, Philippines. According to the 2020 census, it has a population of 355,330 people.

It used to be known as the "richest municipality in the Philippines" because of the large populace of migrants working in the town's industrial estates. Nestlé Philippines, Asia Brewery, Inc., San Miguel Corporation, Tanduay Distillers, Inc., Wyeth Philippines, Inc., Procter & Gamble Philippines, Light Industry and Science Park of the Philippines and Mapúa Malayan Colleges Laguna have established factories or are located in Cabuyao.

By virtue of Republic Act No. 10163, the municipality of Cabuyao was converted to a component city, after the ratification of a plebiscite held on August 4, 2012.

Etymology

Cabuyao was once the central part of "Tabuco", a large territory which once included the modern-day cities of San Pedro, Biñan, Santa Rosa and Calamba. The name "Cabuyao" came from the kabuyaw tree,   Citrus hystrix.

After the colonization of Manila by Miguel López de Legazpi in 1570, he instructed Capt. Juan de Salcedo to conquer all barangays around the lake of Ba-i, which is now called Laguna de Bay. Just like the settlement of Ba-i, Tabuco had large plain area and rich forestry, and the climate was suited to farm crops. On January 16, 1571, it was announced by López de Legazpi that Tabuco be considered as encomienda or a town under Afirni Manlangit.

The town of Tabuco was located near the corner of a river and the lake of Ba-i which was made bancas or raft as the common means of transportation going to the town of Tabuco. There were many trees of kabuyaw growing around the area. The fruit of kabuyaw was used as shampoo. So, when the priest asked for the name of the place, the native women readily answered "kabuyaw", thinking that the priest was asking for the name of the trees growing around the wharf. From then on, the priests and other Spanish officials called the town of Tabuco as Cabuyao.

History

Pre-Spanish Era
It was estimated that 300 years before the arrival of Catholicism, Malays came yearly to the Philippines.  These Malays were attracted to the progress of Maynila which was the center of commerce/trade by the natives coming around the lake of Ba-i which is known today as Laguna de Bay.  This place was the exchanging point of commerce and trade between the natives and the Chinese, Arabs and other Malay race.  These foreign traders established their respective villages around the lake of Ba-i.

One of the biggest villages established in the western portion of the lake was "Tabuko" or "Hangganang Ilog" which means boundary in the native tongue.  The natives of this village came from Malay race of Malaysia, Indonesia and Indochina.  Tabuko had no definite boundary except for natural landmarks such as the mountain, hills and lake.  It can be said that the boundary of "Tabuko" reached the mountain range of Sungay at the west, Mt. Makiling at the south, the lake of Ba-i at the east and the large track of quicksand at Tunasan it the north.

Spanish Era
After the colonization of Manila by Miguel López de Legazpi in 1570, he instructed Captain Juan de Salcedo to conquer all settlements or barangays around the lake of Ba-i (Laguna de Bay).  The first settlement conquered by Capt. Juan de Salcedo was on the eastern portion of the lake, known today as Taytay and Cainta in the province of Rizal.  Then, he crossed the lake of Ba-i and Acheron at Barangay Pinagsangahan, which is Pagsanjan today, and continued inland and conquered other settlements, known today as Nagcarlan and Majayjay. Because the place was already mountainous, the party of Capt. Juan de Salcedo went back to the Lake of Ba-i and continued to conquer the settlements in the northern portion of Lake Ba-i, now called the town of Bay. In their journey, they anchored at the shore of Tabuko.  Just like the settlement of Ba-i, Tabuko had large plain area and rich forestry and the climate was suited to farm crops.  On January 16, 1571, it was announced by Miguel López de Legazpi that Tabuko be considered as "encomienda" or a town under Gaspar Ramirez.  And that the settlement or barangay Malabanan, Calamba and Santa Rosa be under the administration of Tabuko government.  This was the time that Tabuko had a definite boundary. The boundary at the north was Tunasan, south was Ba-i, west was Sungay and at the east was Lake Ba-i.

The town of Tabuko was located near the corner of a river and the lake of Ba-i which used bancas or raft as the common means of transportation going to Tabuko.  When Franciscan priests came to Tabuko under Father Velin, there were many native females doing their laundry chore near the wharf where the boat of the Franciscan priests docked.  There were many trees of "Kabuyaw", the fruit of which was used as shampoo, growing around the area.  When the priest asked for the name of the place, the native females readily answered "Kabuyaw" thinking that the priest was asking for the name of the trees growing around the wharf.  From then on, the priests and other Spanish officials called the town of Tabuko as Kabuyaw.

The Spaniards made Cabuyao as its center of government, which included the barangay of Malabanan, now the Cities of Biñan, Santa Rosa and Calamba.  Because the barangays became haciendas of the friars, the barangay was separated from Cabuyao one by one.
The first to be separated was barangay Calamba that was hacienda de San Juan Bautista then.  In 1689, barangay Malabanan was separated and became the town of Biñan (now a city).  This was followed by barangay Santa Rosa de Lima.

On the summer of 1896, news spread over Cabuyao that the province of Cavite revolted against the Spanish government.  Anticipating the disorder it will bring to the community, Lt. Isabelo Virtucio readily organized a volunteer group who will fight against the Spanish government.  He coordinated with the different leaders of the revolutionary groups and his group joined the forces of Gen. Paciano Rizal, the brother of our national hero, Dr. Jose Rizal.  The group adopted guerrilla warfare in fighting the Spaniards such as ambush, surprise attack and putting up traps on the roads used by the enemy.  It was almost two (2) years before the Spanish armed forces surrendered in 1898.

American Era
It was not long before the residents of Cabuyao celebrated the independence of the Philippines from the Spanish government when the Americans arrived in 1899.  They thought that the Americans were allies and friends but learned later that the Americans were the next conqueror of the Philippines.

Immediately, Captain Sotero Batallones organized a company of soldiers and fought the Americans who tried to conquer the town of Cabuyao.  On their first encounter, many died on the side of Capt. Batallones' forces and they retreated on the mountain called Kay Sili (which is Barangay Casile today) at the western portion of the town of Cabuyao to prepare for another encounter.  However, the Americans continued conquering other towns and established their headquarters at the convent of the church.  The first American soldiers who arrived at Cabuyao were hostile to the residents of Cabuyao.  They feared most one Lt. Robert who was fearsome, giving penalty to those who were suspected as rebels.

In the early years of American occupation of Cabuyao, peace and order became a problem because of the frequent robbery made by the former Filipino soldiers who refused to surrender to the American forces.  There were leaders of the rebel groups hiding in the forested area of  Kahoy, Kasili at Mangumit like Casinto Perez, Macario Manguiat, Aniceto Oruga and others.  Those who were suspected with association to these rebel leaders were arrested and tortured.

During the height of the campaign for peace and order of the American forces of Cabuyao, its parish priest, Fr. Eulalio Mea, was arrested and imprisoned because he was suspected that he had knowledge of the disorder happening in Cabuyao.  The town justice at that time, Jose Batallones, who knew how to speak English negotiated for the freedom of those who were not really involved.

The first town mayor of Cabuyao was Captain Sotero Batallones, who has previously peacefully surrendered to the Americans. But he was temporarily removed from office when she was suspected as part of the party that abducted Dominador Delfino and Jose Himedes, prominent residents of Cabuyao, in July 1904.  Aniceto Oruga, believed to be the leader of the group, was a former companion of Captain Batallones.  Luis Bella, the vice mayor at the time, was installed as the town mayor.

On August 29, 1904, Mr. Dominador Delfino and Jose Himedes were released from their captivity without any harm incurred on them.  On September 7, 1904, Captain Batallones, reassumed his position as mayor of Cabuyao.

During his term as mayor of Cabuyao, he accomplished many development projects.  He was instrumental in the construction of the school building at Bagong Kalsada, which is now Bonifacio Street.  This building is now the Cabuyao Central School.  On the same year, an artesian well was constructed at the town plaza and another at the new school site.

Agustin Dedicatoria replaced Sotero Battalones, as mayor of Cabuyao and served from 1913 to 1916.  He was instrumental in the construction of the monument of Dr. Jose Rizal at the Cabuyao City Plaza and the establishment of the new municipal cemetery at the southwestern portions of the town somewhere the area of Puntod.

Jose Bella (1917–1919), who succeeded Agustin Dedicatoria, gave priority on the improvement of education and school buildings.  He was also instrumental in the planting of mango trees around the Cabuyao Town Plaza and construction of school building at Barangay Mamatid and Pulo.

In 1920, Exequiel Alipit was elected as mayor of Cabuyao but he was questioned because of his age.  He was not of legal age when he was elected as required by law during that time.  However, he served as mayor because he insisted that the people elected him to the position and not on the technicality of law.  The case reached the Supreme Court which eventually decided on his disqualification from office.  Manuel Basa, his vice mayor, replaced him.  The case is included in the book of jurisprudence and is used as a reference in deciding cases of the same nature.
Mayor Exequiel Alipit was able to improve the drainage canal and road at Barangay Bigaa using the 200 prisoners he requested from the Bureau of Prison.

The program of Januario Virtucio, who succeeded Alipit as mayor, centered on the construction of additional classrooms, improvement and construction of roads, and vaccination of all residents of Cabuyao.

Simeon Batallones was elected after Virtucio.  He was commonly known as "Bargat" because he was brave enough to fight and control the cattle rustlers of the town.  Like Mayor Alipit, he was not in good terms with the members of the municipal council and as such, he was not able to complete his term of office. Martin Alcasabas, his vice mayor, succeeded him.

Emilio Tanchico, who served from 1921 to 1931, was the first mayor elected from a poor family.  He used his good public relations and intellect as assets to be elected as mayor.  During his administration, he exerted efforts so that electricity can reach Cabuyao.  He also prepared the site where the public market that had been located near the church was transferred, Camino Real, now called J.P. Rizal Avenue.

The next mayor, Dr. Alberto Carpena, was well loved by his townmates and became the only re-elected mayor of Cabuyao.  His main thrust of government was community hygiene; free medical services were conducted.  He was responsible for the construction of the Domestic Science Building located at the Central School of Cabuyao.  He was also responsible for widening the road going to the public cemetery and other improvements at the public market such as construction of its concrete fence.

There were so many national events that happened during the term of Dr. Alberto Carpena who served from 1932 to 1936.  It was during his term that the election for delegates to the Constitutional Assembly was held for the drafting of the Philippine Constitution (June 10, 1934).  On December 14, 1935, women were given the right to vote (Women's suffrage).  The event most remembered was the bloodiest encountered between the government (Constabulary) and the Sakdalistas of the town.  It happened on May 2–3, 1935 at the town plaza and compound of the church.

The next elected Mayor of Cabuyao was Mayor Nicolas Limcaoco who served from 1937 to 1940.  The original 3-year term was amended by the Constitution and made the new term of elected mayor to four (4) years.  His accomplishments included the construction of road from Poblacion to Barangay Marinig which shortened the travel time going to the different barangays along the coastal area of the town, and the installation of water line from Matang Tubig at Casile to Poblacion.  The project was completed in 1938 through the supervision of Jose L. Acuña who was elected as mayor in 1941.

Japanese Occupation
On January 1, 1942, the Japanese Imperial Army arrived and conquered Cabuyao after they bombed Pearl Harbor in Hawaii on December 8, 1941.  The first group of the Japanese Imperial Army came from the battleground of Mauban, Quezon.  This was followed by a great number of Japanese soldiers who proceeded to Manila and Bataan where a fierce battle was fought.

Because of the cruelty of the Japanese Imperial Army, the people of Cabuyao joined secret organizations known as "guerilla".  The leaders of these groups were former USAFFEs who fought in Bataan and Corregidor.  There was the Markings Guerilla, Pres. Manuel L. Quezon’s Own Guerilla (PQOC), Hunters ROTC, Straught Fil-American Troops, III Army Corps, FAIT, Ansay Suicide Regiment and La Fabella Regiment.

In Cabuyao, there was no direct military confrontation between the Japanese soldiers and Filipinos.  Instead, it was between the Makapili, a pro-Japanese group and the guerrillas. The known guerrilla leaders of Cabuyao were Col. Nicolas Soriano, Maj. Amado Garcia, Maj. Romulo Alcasabas, Maj. Raymundo Tanchico, Maj. Placido Aragon and Capt. Pablo Garcia to mention a few.

Liberation period
On the morning of September 21, 1944, the people of Cabuyao were surprised to hear the sound of American airplanes going to Manila for bombing operations.  It was on January 1, 1941, that American forces, part of the 7th Army Corps under Gen. Krueger, arrived at Cabuyao.  The first group of American soldiers was led by Capt. Brown, who made their camp at the church compound (Patio).

Before the arrival of joint American and Philippine Commonwealth army soldiers to Cabuyao, the town was under the control of guerrilla under the leadership of Col. Nicolas Soriano.  Thus, no military encounter occurred.  The Americans readily established provisionary government called the Philippine Civil Affairs Unit (PCAU) where Mr. Enrique Hemedes was appointed as head.  The office was responsible for the distribution of food and clothing to the needy people of Cabuyao but with priority to the evacuees coming from nearby towns.

When the arrival by the local Filipino troops of the 4th, 42nd and 47th Infantry Division of the Philippine Commonwealth Army and 4th Constabulary Regiment of the Philippine Constabulary in Cabuyao was taken from the town municipalities and aiding by the local guerrillas and the U.S. troops against the Japanese.

Mr. Emilio Tanchico replaced Mr. Enrique Hemedes.  Mr. Tanchico was responsible for restoring the operations of the municipal government of Cabuyao such as the Office of the Treasurer, Office of Police, Postal Office and Communication and other offices.  Mr. Nicolas Limcaoco then replaced him in the middle of 1946 and served until 1947.

The first thing Mr. Nicolas Limcaoco did was to establish peace and order in the locality.  There were so many loose firearms because of the recent war, which led to robberies, theft, killing and other criminal offenses.  He hired 10 "terong" (toughies) coming from the mountainous areas of Cabuyao and appointed them as policemen. Criminality was lessened and peace and order was maintained during that time in Cabuyao.

Post World War II
When the Philippines gained its Independence on July 4, 1946, a presidential election preceded it where President Manuel Roxas was elected as the first president of the Third Republic.  The president appointed Mr. Jose L. Acuña as mayor of Cabuyao.

Mayor Acuña restored the organizational set up of the Municipal Government of Cabuyao.  He assisted the war veterans of Cabuyao in receiving their back pay, those whose properties were destroyed during the war in receiving war damage, and freed from jail people mistaken as Makapili or collaborators.

In 1947 local election, Mr. Lope B. Diamante was elected as mayor.  Mayor Mauro H. Alimagno served for three terms: 1952–55, 1956–59 and 1960–63.  Mr. Antonio Bailon served as mayor during the term 1964–67.

Mayor Alimagno again served during the period 1968–71, 1972–79 and 1980.  However, he failed to complete his last term as mayor in 1980 as he was gunned down in Calamba. Vice Mayor Nicanor Alcasabas succeeded as mayor and served the remaining term. After the EDSA Revolution, Mr. Isidro T. Hildawa was appointed mayor of Cabuyao.  However, he was later appointed as member of the Provincial Board of Laguna, so it was Mr. Constancio G. Alimagno, Jr. who was appointed as mayor on April 1, 1986.

Mayor Proceso Aguillo was elected mayor of Cabuyao in the 1988 local election.  Mayor Constancio G. Alimagno, Jr. served as mayor in 1992–95. Mayor Proceso Aguillo serves as mayor starting 1995 up to 2004. Mayor Nila G. Aguillo, wife of Proceso Aguillo, assumed office until 2007. Mayor Isidro Hemedes, Jr. a relative of then Mayor Enrique Hemedez, ascended into office from 2007 to 2016

What is common to these elected mayors is their concern for the general welfare of their constituents and the continuous implementation of programs, projects and activities towards the attainment of their objective of a peaceful and progressive place. The legacy left by these chief executives of the old town paved the road towards its transformation into the status of a component city, a status it currently enjoys.

Cityhood

On December 6, 2010, Laguna 2nd District Representative Justin Marc S.B. Chipeco filed House Bill No. 03811 or an Act Converting the Municipality of Cabuyao into a Component City of the Province of Laguna. The bill was referred to the Committee on Local Government dated December 13, 2010, and substituted to House Bill No. 4259. The Municipal Mayor as well as the residents of the town fully supported the measure and they looked forward for Cabuyao to become a City since it was fully deserving and qualified. After the successful readings and committee hearings of the bill, both in the House of Congress and Senate, the bill was approved by the senate on January 16, 2012, the same date when Cabuyao celebrates its 441st Founding Anniversary.

On May 16, 2012, President Benigno Aquino III approved House Bill No. 4259 or the Cabuyao City Charter and signed into law by virtue of Republic Act No. 10163. On August 4, 2012, a plebiscite was held to ratify the conversion of the town into a city. A total of 24,670 Cabuyeños took part on the historical event, 22,132 voters or 89.71% of the total number of voters voted "Yes" while the remaining 2,538 or only 10.29% voted "No". The City of Cabuyao is the 142nd city in the Philippines and 5th component city in Laguna besides San Pablo City, Calamba, Santa Rosa City and Biñan.

Geography
It is bordered by Santa Rosa City to the north, Laguna de Bay, the country's largest lake, to the east, Calamba to the south, Tagaytay City to the southwest, and Silang, Cavite to the east.

The only lake found in Cabuyao is Laguna de Bay. Barangays situated along the lake are Bigaa, Butong, Marinig, Gulod, Baclaran and Mamatid. Types of Fish found in the lake are kanduli, biya, talapia, ayungin, hito, karpa, mamale, bangus, dalag, papalo, kakasuhet and dulong. The Cabuyao Fishing Port can be found on Barangay Marinig where many Cabuyeños and Cabuyeñas take zumba every Saturday and Sunday as the sun rises.

For rivers, Cabuyao has the following:
Cabuyao River – Between the boundary of Santa Rosa and Cabuyao.
Marinig River – Between the boundary of Barangays Bigaa and Marinig. The river was connected from Niugan-Sala river and the river flows directed to Laguna de Bay
Niugan-Sala River – The river flows along the boundary of Barangays Niugan and Sala.
Tiway-Tiway River – The most famous river of the town. The river flows directed to Laguna de Bay.
San Cristobal River – Between the boundary of Calamba and Cabuyao.

The ricefields/ricelands in Cabuyao are found in Barangay Bigaa, Butong, Marinig, Gulod, Baclaran, Mamatid, San Isidro, Pulo, Banay-Banay, Niugan and Sala. As of year 2004, the total area of riceland is 940.56 hectares (9.4056 in square kilometers) and 468 farmers as per data of the City Agriculture Office.

Narra Trees are planted along the Poblacion-Marinig Road and beside the compound of the City Hall of Cabuyao. Agricultural crops are palay, squash, garlic, watermelon, pineapple, coffee and other fruit bearing plants.

Barangays

Cabuyao was politically divided into eighteen (18) urbanized barangays.

Climate

Demographics

Population

In the 2020 census, Cabuyao had a population of 355,330.
By that, the city also surpassed San Pablo City in 2015, making it the fifth most populated city in Laguna. It is also the third most densely-populated city in Laguna as of 2015.

According to the 2015 Census, Cabuyao has a population of 308,745 (up from 106,630 people in 22,552 households in 2000), making it the fifth largest Local Government Unit and city of Laguna. The city has a population density of 7,100/km2 (18,000 sq mi).

Religion

Cabuyao is predominantly Christian of whom 93% are Roman Catholics., while the Members Church of God International claims 2%, and the Iglesia ni Cristo 1% of the Cabuyao populace. Other religious groups/sectors with smaller membership include Methodists, Buddhists, Lutherans, Jesus Is Lord Church, Jehovah's Witnesses, Bible Baptist, Four Square Gospel, and Lamp Christian Fellowship Church.

Religious sites

The St. Polycarp Parish, in Barangay Uno, was built in 1763. Until this time Cabuyao is the only place in the Philippines where St. Polycarp is the patron saint.

The second church constructed in Cabuyao after the first church situated in Barangay Marinig was destroyed by flood and tidal waves. Father Mariano Gomez, one of the martyred GOMBURZA priests, became the parish priest of the church from 1848 to 1862. The records of the church are intact from the 18th century to the present.

The Diocesan Shrine of San Vicente Ferrer was then San Vicente Ferrer Parish built in 1946. It is located in Barangay Mamatid. It was in 2010 when the parish church was declared a Diocesan Shrine dedicated to Saint Vincent Ferrer because of its numerous devotees from different towns, cities and provinces. A relic of Saint Vincent Ferrer is displayed in a museum behind the church.

Poor Clare Monastery of the Blessed Sacrament is a monastery of St. Clare of Assisi located in P. Burgos St., Poblacion I, Cabuyao in the ecclesiastical jurisdiction of the Roman Catholic Diocese of San Pablo. It is one of the religious sites of the city, where large number of devotees are coming and offering eggs as they pray for giving a birth for a baby. They donate the eggs as food for poor people. The monastery is one of the monasteries visited by the relic of St. Clare during its visit in the country in 2012.

Economy

Government

Elected officials

Former Municipal Mayors

Municipal Hall

City seal

Anthem
The official anthem of the City of Cabuyao and its people is "Cabuyao Hymn" or "Imno ng Kabuyaw", it is sung during flag ceremonies of all schools and government institutions along with the country's national anthem, Lupang Hinirang. The anthem was composed by Vehnee Saturno, a native of Cabuyao. The "Cabuyao March" or "Martsa ng Cabuyao", is the official march of the city, The music is by Domingo A. Alconaba and lyrics by Domingo M. Batalla, both also natives of the city. It is also sung along with "Calabarzon March", the region's official march.

Education

Cabuyao hosts a number of universities and colleges such as:

Infrastructure

Transportation

Cabuyao is serviced by South Luzon Expressway (SLEX). Cabuyao Exit is located in the city, while the Eton City (Malitlit) Exit is located near its boundary with Santa Rosa. The city is also accessible through Silangan Exit in Calamba, which provides access to Carmelray Industrial up to Nuvali Circle.

A four-lane national highway from Alabang, Muntinlupa up to Calamba, Laguna passes through the city. Another road, Canlubang golf road, acts as the access/shortcut route for people going up to People's park in the sky and to Tagaytay from Nuvali and Silangan Exit.

Public transportation within the city, like in most of the urban areas in the Philippines, is facilitated mostly using inexpensive jeepneys. Tricycles are also used for short distances. The city is served by two railway stations: Cabuyao and Mamatid.

Culture

Cabuyao Day
Since the City of Cabuyao was founded by Miguel López de Legazpi on January 16, 1571, the City Government of Cabuyao celebrates "Cabuyao Day" every 16th day of January. It consists of a week-long celebration starting from a Parade of Floats of each barangay, in which the decorations of each float feature and showcase the way of living of the community of each barangay of Cabuyao. Followed by Street Dancing Competition at the City Proper, in which all College and High Schools compete for the said competition. The celebration also includes different amateur shows like Orchestra, Music Band and Celebrity shows at the City Plaza. And the highlights of the whole celebration is the official beauty pageant of the city, the "Mutya ng Cabuyao" and "Lakan ng Cabuyao" pageants.

Santo Niño de Cabuyao Festival
The City of Cabuyao and its people celebrate the feast of the Child Jesus or Santo Niño in the Philippines every third (3rd) Sunday of January. It starts from a Mass at the Cabuyao Church followed by a festival in which all Cabuyeños call it as "Santo Niño de Cabuyao Festival". It is a parade of all Santos Niños along the City Proper. The festivities and tradition was started in 1981 by Alimagno family (then Judge Constancio Sr. and wife Mely) as a gesture of thanksgiving as their son Kennedy survived a near fatal accident in last quarter of 1979.

Batingaw Festival
A festivity commemorating the legendary Kampanang Ginto which Cabuyao is known. The celebration always starts with the simultaneous ringing of church bells, which Cabuyeños believe that it brings good agricultural harvest. The highlights of the five (5) days festival include the parade of the Kampanang Ginto, colorful street dancing, singing contest, trade fair exhibits, Mutya and Lakan ng Cabuyao and fireworks.

City Fiesta
The City Fiesta of Cabuyao is every 23rd day of February in honor of the city's Patron Saint, Saint Polycarp, Bishop and Martyr.

Notable personalities
Nila Aguillo, first female mayor of the city
Salud Algabre, Filipina revolutionary and leader of the Sakdal movement.
Mercedes Delfinado, acarologist
Cielito Habito, economist, professor, and columnist
Jedah Hernandez, beauty pageant titleholder
Teresita S. Lazaro, former Governor of Laguna
Sabrina Man, child actress
Fhea Piamonte, Beauty Queen
Charo Ronquillo, model
Vehnee Saturno, composer, songwriter, and record producer
Anthony Villanueva, boxer, 1964 Summer Olympics silver medalist
Jake Zyrus (formerly Charice Pempengco), singer

Sister cities

Local

References

External links

Official Website of the City of Cabuyao
 [ Philippine Standard Geographic Code]
Philippine Census Information
Local Governance Performance Management System

 
Cities in Laguna (province)
Populated places established in 1571
1571 establishments in the Philippines
Populated places on Laguna de Bay
Component cities in the Philippines